A Hard God is a semi-autobiographical play by Peter Kenna.

The play was very popular and has come to be regarded as an Australian classic.

1974 Film

The Nimrod Theatre version of the play was directed by John Bell. This was filmed by the ABC in 1974.

Cast
James Bowles
Gloria Dawn
Gerry Duggan
Graham Rouse
Kay Elkund
Tony Sheldon
Andrew Sharp

1981 Film

The play was adapted for TV again by the ABC in 1981 for the Australian Theatre Festival.

Cast
 Patrick Phillips
 Betty Lucas
Simon Burke
Dawn Lake
Martin Vaughan
Graham Rouse
Philippa Baker

References

External links
Review of 2006 production at Variety

1981 TV adaptation at Australian Screen Online

1981 TV version at Screen Australia

Australian plays
Autobiographical plays
1973 plays